L. salvadorensis  may refer to:
 Leucaena salvadorensis, a plant species found in El Salvador, Honduras and Nicaragua
 Lonchocarpus salvadorensis, the Sangre de Chucho, a plant species